Professor John Stewart Parker is a British botanist and was the fifth Director, Cambridge University Botanic Garden  (1996 – 2010), succeeding Donald Pigott.

Life and work 

John Parker was educated at Oxford University, getting his D.Phil. in 1971 for his work on plant chromosomes and natural populations. From Oxford he became Lecturer and then Reader in Genetics, Queen Mary College, University of London (1969 – 1992). Subsequently, he became head of the Botany Department at Reading University (1992 – 1996) before moving to Cambridge in 1996 as Director of the Botanic Garden, Curator of the University Herbarium (1999 – 2010) and Professor of Plant Cytogenetics.

He came into the position at a time when the university's 1995 review had urged forging greater links between the Garden and the university's academic departments. In addition to forging links within the university, Parker set about creating links with the community, such as schools programmes. On the research side, Parker established the Genetics Garden in 1998, and oversaw the planning of the Sainsbury Laboratory which was officially opened in 2011. His major research interests have been in evolutionary genetics. He was a Fellow and then Emeritus Fellow of Clare Hall, Cambridge. On relinquishing his position at the Botanic Garden in 2010, Tim Upson became acting director 2010–2013 when Beverley Glover became the sixth Director.

Selected publications

References

Bibliography 

 
 , in 
 
 , in 
 
 
 Cover

English botanists
Fellows of Clare Hall, Cambridge
Living people
Year of birth missing (living people)